Lewis Dewart (November 14, 1780 – April 26, 1852) was a Jacksonian member of the U.S. House of Representatives from Pennsylvania.

Biography
Lewis Dewart (father of William Lewis Dewart) was born in Sunbury, Pennsylvania.  He was a clerk in his father's store for several years and later became a coal operator and banker.  He served as postmaster at Sunbury from 1806 to 1816.  He was a member of the Pennsylvania House of Representatives from 1812 to 1820.  He was elected to the Pennsylvania State Senate in 1823 and served three years.  He was one of the organizers and builders of the Danville & Pottsville Railroad, and served as one of the first directors.

Dewart was elected as a Jacksonian to the Twenty-second Congress.  He was again a member of the Pennsylvania House of Representatives from 1835 to 1840 and served as speaker in 1840.  He was chief burgess of Sunbury in 1837 and a member of the school board.  He was an unsuccessful candidate for the Democratic nomination for Governor of Pennsylvania in 1841.  He died in Sunbury in 1852 and was buried in Sunbury Cemetery.

See also
 Speaker of the Pennsylvania House of Representatives

Sources

The Political Graveyard

Members of the Pennsylvania House of Representatives
Pennsylvania state senators
Pennsylvania postmasters
1780 births
1852 deaths
Clerks
Jacksonian members of the United States House of Representatives from Pennsylvania
School board members in Pennsylvania
19th-century American politicians